Moufdi Zakaria (born Zekri Cheikh; 12 June 1908 – 17 August 1977) was an Algerian activist and nationalist , poet and writer. He wrote "Kassaman", the Algerian national anthem while in prison in 1955.

Biography
Cheikh Zakaria Ben Slimane Ben Yahia Ben Cheikh Slimane Ben Hadj Aissa was born on 12 June 1908. He was given the nickname of Moufdi by a school friend. Of Mozabite origin, he was born and attended school in the M'zab region of Algeria. 

He became associated with Algerian nationalists and served time in prison for his beliefs in 1937 and 1938.

In 1955 he was imprisoned in Serkadji prison by the French for his politics. There he wrote a poem called Qassaman or The Pledge. It was said that he wrote the poem on the walls of his cell using his own blood because he had neither pencils nor paper to write in the prison. The poem was later set to music by Mohamed Triki in 1956 and then by Mohamed Fawzi. The final song was heard in 1957. This poem became the Algerian national anthem shortly after 5 July 1962 when independence was achieved.

Zakaria died in 1977 in Tunisia but his body was buried in Algeria.

His Poetry

His university education was in Tunis where he met a number of poets including Kasman. His first poetry was published in a Tunisian newspaper in 1925.

Moufdi Zakaria uses implied texts in his poems through which readers can get different reflections from his poems. Quran is one of the implied texts in his works and it is strongly present in his works.

His poetry was believed to be largely influenced by the work of Egyptian poet Ahmed Shawqi.

Legacy
Zakaria left his poetry and the words to Algeria's national anthem. He has postage stamps issued in his honour and Noumérat – Moufdi Zakaria Airport in Ghardaïa, Algeria is named in his honour. His name was also given to cultural centre built in 1984.

Portrayals in film
"Moufdi Zakaria, the Poet of the Revolution," by director Said Oulmi, 2012.

References

1908 births
1977 deaths
20th-century Algerian poets
Algerian expatriates in Tunisia
Algerian male poets
Algerian songwriters
Berber Algerians
Berber poets
National anthem writers
People from Ghardaïa
20th-century male writers